The McIntyre House is a historic house in rural Benton County, Arkansas, near the community of Logan.  It is a -story wood-frame structure, with clapboard siding and a wide clipped-gable roof.  A shed-roof porch extends across the front, supported by turned columns and simple decorative woodwork.  Built c. 1910, the house is an excellent local example of a rural vernacular Queen Anne farmhouse.

The house was listed on the National Register of Historic Places in 1988.

See also
National Register of Historic Places listings in Benton County, Arkansas

References

Houses on the National Register of Historic Places in Arkansas
Queen Anne architecture in Arkansas
Houses completed in 1910
Houses in Benton County, Arkansas
National Register of Historic Places in Benton County, Arkansas
1910 establishments in Arkansas